Cretan bryony is a common name for several plants and may refer to:

Bryonia dioica, native to central and southern Europe